Luhonono, until 2013 Schuckmannsburg, is a settlement in the Caprivi Strip in northeastern Namibia with a population of about 800. It belongs to the Kabbe North electoral constituency of the Zambezi Region. During the time of German colonialism, it was the capital of the Caprivi Strip.

Location

History

The original name of the settlement was Luhonono, after the Luhonono tree (Terminalia sericea) endemic in that area. The settlement was founded under the name Schuckmannsburg on 7 February 1909 by Captain Kurt Streitwolf as "Imperial Residence in the Caprivi Strip". Its namesake was the then Governor of German South West Africa, Bruno von Schuckmann. The purpose of founding this place in such a remote area was to visibly take ownership, on the colonial administration's behalf, of the Caprivi Strip, which had formally been part of German Southwest Africa since 1890. The exact location was chosen because it was directly opposite Mwandi, a North Rhodesian settlement under British rule, and infrastructure such as a post office and a hospital, was readily available there. The Imperial Resident Streitwolf, who had at his command three German junior officers as well as a few Askaris as assistant policemen, put up buildings, mapped the area, and consolidated the administration.

In 1911, Victor von Frankenberg und Proschlitz took over the Resident's post, thereafter known, however, as District Chief. In late September 1914, he surrendered Schuckmannsburg without a fight to an advancing detachment of the British South Africa Police from Southern Rhodesia which was cooperating with a detachment of the Northern Rhodesia Police (NRP). Captain Eason then became the new administrator. Lieutenant O'Sullevan of the NRP said that the Caprivi had
the largest, most vindictive, and venomous mosquitoes I have seen ... in the wet season it is a swamp and unhealthy; in the dry weather the heat is terrific, whilst the sand is deep and uncomfortable to walk in

German rule ended in Southwest Africa (Namibia) as Germany was stripped of its colonies by the Treaty of Versailles after the end of the First World War in 1918. The South Africans took over the administrative centre at Schuckmannsburg but decided to abandon the place because of the annual heavy flooding of the area. Thus Schuckmannsburg lost its political importance when on 28 January 1935 Katima Mulilo took its administrative functions. Because of a shortage of building material in Katima Mulilo – no shops and no buildings were present there at that time – many buildings were taken apart so that the bricks could be reused in the new regional seat.

Luhonono today
The village nowadays consists of wooden cabins and a few less sturdy buildings. The only intact relic of German colonial time is a little brick house with a floor area of about 12 m2 built in 1909, the only brick building not dismantled for building material when the regional offices were moved to Katima Mulilo. On 9 August 2013, the Namibian government renamed Schuckmannsburg Luhonono.

The D3508, in 2021 renamed Brendan Simbwaye Road, connects Luhonono to Isize and Namalubi.

Literature 
 Rainer D.K. Bruchmann: Schuckmannsburg, Kuiseb-Verlag, Windhuk 1997, 
 Edward Paice: Tip and Run: the untold tragedy of the Great War in Africa, 2007, page 33

References

Populated places in the Zambezi Region
1909 establishments in German South West Africa
Populated places established in 1909